Wiluyu (Aymara wila blood, blood-red, uyu corral, "red corral", hispanicized spelling Viluyo) is a mountain in the Andes of Peru, about  high. It is located in the Cusco Region, Canchis Province, Marangani District. Wiluyu lies east of Langui Layo Lake, north of Pawka.

References

Mountains of Cusco Region
Mountains of Peru